= Cystatin-8 =

Protein-coding gene in humans

CST8

Identifiers
- Aliases: CST8, CRES, CTES5, cystatin 8
- External IDs: OMIM: 608683; MGI: 107161; GeneCards: CST8

Gene location (Human)
Chr.	Chromosome 20 (human)
Band	20p11.21	Start	23,491,101 bp
Band	20p11.21	End	23,496,010 bp

Gene location (Mouse)
Chr.	Chromosome 2 (mouse)
Band	2 G3|2 73.56 cM	Start	148,640,705 bp
Band	2 G3|2 73.56 cM	End	148,647,515 bp
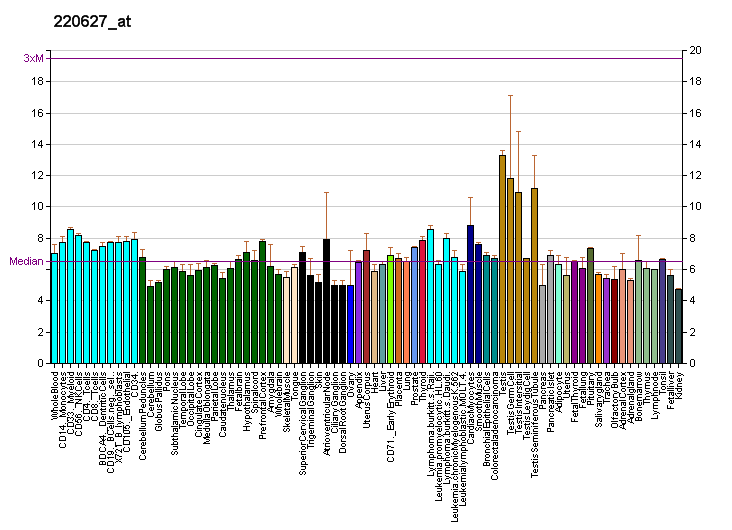
RNA expression pattern
Bgee	Human / Mouse (ortholog); Top expressed in: testicle; right testis; left testis; buccal mucosa cell; sperm; human musculoskeletal system; muscular system; muscle; muscle; skeletal muscle / Top expressed in: seminiferous tubule; spermatid; superior surface of tongue; gallbladder; Gonadal ridge; spermatocyte; ovary; Sertoli cell; left lung lobe; adrenal gland; More reference expression data
BioGPS	More reference expression data
Gene ontology
Molecular function	peptidase inhibitor activity; protease binding; cysteine-type endopeptidase inhibitor activity
Cellular component	cytoplasm; extracellular region; cell surface; extracellular space
Biological process	negative regulation of peptidase activity; negative regulation of cysteine-type endopeptidase activity; negative regulation of endopeptidase activity
Sources:Amigo / QuickGO
Orthologs
Databases	NCBI: entry; OMA: entry
Species	Human	Mouse
Entrez	10047	13012
Ensembl	ENSG00000125815	ENSMUSG00000027442
UniProt	O60676	P32766
RefSeq (mRNA)	NM_001281730; NM_005492	NM_009978
RefSeq (protein)	NP_001268659; NP_005483	NP_034108
Location (UCSC)	Chr 20: 23.49 – 23.5 Mb	Chr 2: 148.64 – 148.65 Mb
PubMed search
- Wikidata
View/Edit Human	View/Edit Mouse

Cystatin-8 is a protein that in humans is encoded by the CST8 gene.

The cystatin superfamily encompasses proteins that contain multiple cystatin-like sequences. Some of the members are active cysteine protease inhibitors, while others have lost or perhaps never acquired this inhibitory activity. There are three inhibitory families in the superfamily, including the type 1 cystatins (stefins), type 2 cystatins and the kininogens. The type 2 cystatin proteins are a class of cysteine proteinase inhibitors found in a variety of human fluids and secretions. The cystatin locus on chromosome 20 contains the majority of the type 2 cystatin genes and pseudogenes. This gene is located in the cystatin locus and encodes a protein similar to type 2 cystatins. The protein exhibits highly tissue-specific expression in the reproductive tract, suggesting implicit roles in reproduction. Alternative splicing identified in mouse is suggested in human based on EST evidence but the full-length nature of putative variants has not been determined.
